Before the Party is the sixth mixtape by American recording artist Chris Brown; it was released on November 27, 2015, by Chris Brown Entertainment on DatPiff for free. The mixtape contains appearances from French Montana, Wiz Khalifa, Wale, Fetty Wap, Tyga, Rihanna and more. It also includes production from Kuk Harrell, Danja, David Banner, Drumma Boy, among others. Before the Party was released as a prelude to his seventh studio album, Royalty.

Before the Party received positive reviews from music critics, that praised its sound, the performances and its songwriting. It received a great success, becoming one of the most listened and downloaded free mixtapes on DatPiff ever.

The mixtape was re-released as a commercial mixtape exclusively on the streaming platforms Tidal and Amazon Music on August 15, 2017, in its entirety.

Release 
On October 13, 2015, Brown announced that his upcoming album Royalty would've been released on November 27, 2015. After it was revealed that the album has been pushed back to December 18, 2015, in exchange on November 27, 2015, he released a free 34-track mixtape, called Before the Party, as a prelude to Royalty. The cover art features an anime depiction of Brown, posing stoically in a Bape coat, floating somewhere in the universe with a woman with bountiful cleavage and a Transfomer head.

The mixtape was re-released as a commercial mixtape exclusively on the streaming platforms Tidal and Amazon Music on August 15, 2017, in its entirety.

Reception

Critical reception 

Before the Party received positive reviews from music critics, some of them even said that the mixtape was a better work than his album Royalty, which the mixtape was supposed to be a prelude to. HotNewHipHops Nicholas DG expressed a positive response, praising it for being "an impressive massive mixtape", saying that the track "Holy Angel" is one of Brown's best songs ever, expressing how "is bent on collecting the hardships and sins he has faced throughout his lifetime". Other tracks praised by the critic were "Play Me", because of his "slowly crescendoing orchestral sound and a hypnotic drum beat", "Desperado", being a "perfect musical embodiment to the song's narrator's feeling of never-ending betrayal", "Gotta Get Up", describing it as a "Michael Jackson's heavily inspired track", and "FAN (Freak at Night)" because of his blending genres of rock, hip-hop and electro. Jules Blackolm of Rolling Stone commented that "the gangsta side of the mixtape is enjoyable on songs like "Ghetto Tales" and "All I Need", but where the mixtape sounds stunning is on his soft side, with songs like "Matter", "Roses Turn Blue", "Play Me" and "Start It Slow" thanks to their profound songwriting and Brown's impeccable quavered harmonize".

John Roother of The A.V. Club calld the mixtape a "quite and delicate R&B masterpiece" stating that Brown went "experimental" on songs like "Just So You Know" and "FAN" and that he "did his best on the funky "Go", "Gotta Get Up" and "Come Home Tonight", touching the sky with the hypnotic "Start It Slow". Digital Spys Ian Sandwell said that the mixtape was "better than expectations", praising tracks like "Holy Angel", "Counterfeit", "Text Message" and "Hell of a Night". The Daily Reveilles Sarah LeBoeuf wrote that she was "a bit disappointed" from the mixtape, saying that "Holy Angel", "Counterfeit", "Go" and "Sex" were highlights from the mixtape, but other songs like "Swallow Me Down" or "Hell of a Night" were unnecessary, saying that the mixtape at some points was "too repetitive, removing its filler tracks would've made this one of Brown's best works to date".

Commercial performance 
It received a great success being one of the most listened and downloaded free mixtapes on DatPiff, being certified double platinum by the site's standards, reaching over 500,000 downloads and over 3,000,000 full listens.

Track listing 

Sample credits
"All I Need" contains elements of "Me and My Girlfriend" (1996) performed by Tupac Shakur. and "Miss You, Goodbye" by K. Michelle (2014).
"Roses Turn Blue" contains elements of "Merry Christmas Mr. Lawrence" (1983) performed by Ryuichi Sakamoto.
"Hell of a Night" contains elements of "Last Night a D.J. Saved My Life" (1983) performed by Indeep.
”Beat It Up” contains elements of "Escapade" (1990) performed by Janet Jackson.
”Till The Morning” contains elements of "You're Not My Kind of Girl" (1988) performed by New Edition.

References 

Chris Brown albums
2015 mixtape albums
Albums produced by J.U.S.T.I.C.E. League
Albums produced by Drumma Boy
Albums produced by David Banner
Albums produced by DJ Khaled
Albums produced by Nard & B
Albums produced by Danja (record producer)
Albums produced by Kuk Harrell